London's Finest (originally released as Hackney's Finest) is a 2014 British dark comedy film directed by Chris Bouchard.  It stars Nathanael Wiseman as a small-time drug-dealer who gets into big trouble when a corrupt East London cop tries to steal a consignment meant for Welsh-Jamaican Yardies.

Plot 
A dirty cop pursues a vendetta against some small time London drug-dealers, who are hiding a shipment of heroin. Sirus and his friends have to sober up to stay alive, with the help of some gun-toting Yardies.

Cast 
 Nathanael Wiseman as Sirus
 Enoch Frost as Tony
 Marlon G. Day as B
 Neerja Naik as Pari
 Sean Cronin as Delski
 Jeanette Rourke as Jane
 Arin Alldridge as Priestly
 Malcolm Tomlinson as Terence
Adolfo Espina as Russian thug

References

External links
 

2014 films
British black comedy films
2014 directorial debut films
2010s English-language films
2010s British films